The following is a list of notable deaths in February 1996.

Entries for each day are listed alphabetically by surname. A typical entry lists information in the following sequence:
 Name, age, country of citizenship at birth, subsequent country of citizenship (if applicable), reason for notability, cause of death (if known), and reference.

February 1996

1
Adel Adham, 67, Egyptian film actor, pneumonia.
Sergey Aganov, 78, Soviet/Russian Marshal of the engineer troops.
Benny Brown, 42, American track and field athlete and olympic champion, traffic collision.
Ray Crawford, 80, American fighter ace during World War II and racecar driver.
Kevin Williams, 38, American gridiron football player in the National Football League, train crash.

2
Sylwester Braun, 87, Polish photographer and army officer.
Shamus Culhane, 87, American animator and director.
Fred S. Keller, 97, American psychologist and a pioneer in experimental psychology.
Gene Kelly, 83, American actor (Singin' in the Rain, An American in Paris, Anchors Aweigh) and dancer, stroke.
Vernon Nicholls, 78, British bishop.
Li Peiyao, 62, Chinese politician, homicide.
Minao Shibata, 79, Japanese composer and musicologist.
Aline Towne, 76, American actress.
Müfide İlhan, 84, Turkish mayor.

3
Edward Adamson, 84, British artist and art collector.
Larry Eigner, 68, American poet.
Guy Gilles, 57, French film director, AIDS-related complications.
Božo Grkinić, 82, Yugoslav water polo and basketball player and coach.
Audrey Meadows, 73, American actress and banker, lung cancer.

4
Gerry Brand, 89, South African rugby player.
Willard S. Curtin, 90, American politician.
Manolo Fábregas, 74, Spanish-Mexican actor, film director and film producer.
John Hugo Loudon, 90, Dutch businessman and CEO of Royal Dutch Shell.
Lakshman Singh, 85, Indian scouting leader.

5
Gianandrea Gavazzeni, 86, Italian musician.
Hideo Oguni, 91, Japanese screenwriter.
Roberto Raviola, 56, Italian comic book artist, pancreatic cancer.
Lim Chin Siong, 62, Singaporean politician, heart attack.
Antonio Ruiz Soler, 74, Spanish dancer and choreographer.
Ted Tyson, 86, Australian rules football player.
Gary Zeller, 48, American basketball player.

6
Rutherford H. Adkins, 71,  American military aviator and member of the Tuskegee Airmen during World War II.
Guy Madison, 74, American actor (The Adventures of Wild Bill Hickok), pulmonary emphysema.
Bob Muncrief, 80, American baseball player.
Renee Roberts, 87, British actress.
Patsy Smart, 77, British actress.
Jacques Wertheimer, 84, French businessman.

7
Lydia Chukovskaya, 88, Soviet/Russian writer, poet, editor, publicist, and dissident.
I. K. Dairo, 65, Nigerian Jùjú musician.
Phillip Davidson, 80, American lieutenant general.
Barbara Hamilton, 69, Canadian actress, breast cancer.
Lucien Maynard, 87, Canadian politician.
Robert, Archduke of Austria-Este, 80, Austrian prince and Archduke of Austria-Este.
Boris Tchaikovsky, 70, Soviet and Russian composer.
Pat West, 72, American gridiron football player.
Ernst Würthwein, 86, German theologian.

8
T. J. Campion, 77, American football player.
Marcel Capelle, 91, French football player.
Mercer Ellington, 76, American musician, composer, and arranger, heart attack.
Del Ennis, 70, American baseball player, diabetes.
Ri Sung Gi, 90, North Korean chemist.
Bruno Hussar, 84, Egyptian priest.
Siavash Kasraie, 68, Iranian poet, literary critic, and novelist.
José Poy, 69, Argentine football player and manager.
Felice Schwartz, 71, American feminist writer.
Derek Worlock, 76, English catholic prelate and Archbishop of Liverpool, lung cancer.

9
Chitti Babu, 59, Indian musician.
Sir George Trevelyan, 4th Baronet, 89, British baronet and a founding father of the New Age movement.
Adolf Borchers, 82, German Luftwaffe flying ace during World War II.
Stephen Hope Carlill, 93, British Royal Navy admiral.
Yun Chi-Young, 97, Korean politician.
Alistair Cameron Crombie, 80, Australian zoologist and historian of science.
Neil Franklin, 74, English football player and manager.
Adolf Galland, 83,German Luftwaffe flying ace and general during World War II.
Gerald Savory, 86, English playwright and screenwriter specialising in comedies.
Gordon D. Shirreffs, 82, American writer.
Robin Stille, 34, American actress (The Slumber Party Massacre), suicide.

10
Josette Bruce, 76, Polish-French novelist.
Björn-Erik Höijer, 88, Swedish writer.
Giovanni Pontiero, 64, British scholar.
Klaus-Dieter Seehaus, 53, East German football player.

11
Thecla Boesen, 85, Danish film actress.
William F. Claxton, 81, American television director and television producer.
Brian Daley, 48, American writer, pancreatic cancer.
Kebby Musokotwane, 49, Zambian politician and Prime Minister.
Quarentinha, 62, Brazilian football player, heart failure.
Phil Regan, 89, American actor and singer.
Amelia Rosselli, 65, Italian poet, suicide.
Gertrude Sawyer, 100, American architect.
Bob Shaw, 64, Northern Irish science fiction author and novelist, cancer.
Pierre Edouard Leopold Verger, 93, French photographer, anthropologist, and writer.
Olle Åhlund, 75, Swedish football player and manager.

12
Andrea Barbato, 61, Italian journalist, writer and politician.
Gina Falckenberg, 88, German actress.
Betty Roland, 92, Australian playwright and novelist.
Ernest Samuels, 92, American biographer and lawyer.
Ryōtarō Shiba, 72, Japanese writer.

13
Martin Balsam, 76, American actor (A Thousand Clowns, 12 Angry Men, Psycho), Oscar winner (1966), heart attack.
Scott Beach, 65, American actor (American Graffiti, Stand by Me, The Right Stuff) and disc jockey.
Charlie Conerly, 74, American gridiron football player.
George Jefferson, 85, American pole vaulter.
Léopold Langlois, 82, Canadian politician.
Cynthia MacGregor, 31, American tennis player, complications  from anorexia nervosa.
Branko Marjanović, 86, Croatian film director and editor.
Ugyen Rinpoche, 76, Tibetan Buddhist Lama.

14
Lady Caroline Blackwood, 64, British writer and journalist, cancer.
Fritz Hanson, 81, American-Canadian gridiron football player.
Eva Hart, 91, British survivor of the sinking of RMS Titanic, cancer.
Gied Jaspars, 56, Dutch television producer, colorectal cancer.
Čeněk Kottnauer, 85, Czech-British chess master.
Alejandro de la Sota Martínez, 82, Spanish architect.
Bob Paisley, 77, English football player and manager, Alzheimer's disease.
Francisco Tomás y Valiente, 63, Spanish jurist, historian, and writer, homicide.
Sylvester Veitch, 85, American horse trainer.
Mark Venturini, 35, American actor (Friday the 13th: A New Beginning, The Return of the Living Dead, Mikey), leukemia.

15
Lucio Agostini, 82, Italian-Canadian musician.
Margaret Courtenay, 72, Welsh actress.
Peter Gardner, 71, Australian hurdler.
Edward Madejski, 81, Polish football player.
Tommy Rettig, 54, American child actor (Lassie), database programmer, and author, heart attack.
Henri Simonet, 64, Belgian politician.
McLean Stevenson, 68, American actor (M*A*S*H, Hello, Larry, The Doris Day Show) and comedian, heart attack.
Brunó Ferenc Straub, 82, Hungarian biochemist.

16
Roberto Aizenberg, 67, Argentine painter and sculptor.
Roger Bowen, 63, American actor (M*A*S*H, Arnie, Tunnel Vision), heart attack.
Pat Brown, 90, American lawyer and politician and Governor of California.
Nicolae Carandino, 90, Romanian writer.
Eleanor Clark, 82, American writer.
Bert Iannone, 79, Canadian football player.
Miloš Kopecký, 73, Czech actor.
Brownie McGhee, 80, American folk-blues singer and guitarist, stomach cancer.
Kenneth Robinson, 84, British politician.
Ernst Weber, 94, Austrian-American electrical engineer, and microwave technology pioneer.

17
Hervé Bazin, 84, French writer.
Gus Hardin, 50, American country music singer, car accident.
Evelyn Laye, 95, English actress, respiratory failure.
Michel Pablo, 84, Greek Trotskyist leader, stroke.
Nikolai Starostin, 93, Soviet/Russian football player and founder of Spartak Moscow.

18
Madhaviah Krishnan, 83, Indian photographer.
Janice Loeb, 93, American film director, screenwriter, cinematographer and film producer.
Josef Meinrad, 82, Austrian actor, cancer.
Edward O'Brien, 21, Northern Irish IRA volunteer, killed.

19
Sehba Akhtar, 65, Indian poet and songwriter, heart attack.
Brenda Bruce, 76, British actress.
Marco Antonio Campos, 76, Mexican actor, aortic aneurysm.
Antonio Creus, 71, Spanish motorcycle racer and racing driver.
Charles O. Finley, 77, American businessman.
Douglas Livingstone, 64, South African poet.
Ernest Manning, 87, Canadian politician.
Dorothy Maynor, 85, American singer.
Grant Sawyer, 77, American politician and Governor of Nevada.

20
Solomon Asch, 88, Polish-American psychologist.
Charles O. Finley, 77, American businessman.
Walter Marshall, Baron Marshall of Goring, 63, British peer and scientist.
Viktor Konovalenko, 57, Soviet Union ice hockey player.
Mariano Vidal Molina, 70, Argentinian actor.
Carolyn Morris, 70, American baseball player.
Audrey Munson, 104, American artist's model and film actress.
Jeffrey Quill, 83, British test pilot.
Tōru Takemitsu, 65, Japanese composer and writer, bladder cancer.

21
Priscilla Bonner, 97, American silent film actress.
Rune Börjesson, 58, Swedish football player.
Hans-Joachim Bremermann, 69, German-American mathematician and biophysicist, cancer.
Isolina Carrillo, 88, Cuban musician.
Vahagn Davtyan, 73, Armenian writer.
H. L. Gold, 81, American writer.
Morton Gould, 82, American composer, conductor, arranger, and pianist.
August Kammer, 83, American ice hockey player.
Don Laz, 66, American pole vaulter.

22
George Christopher Archibald, 69, British economist and researcher.
Karl Boo, 77, Swedish politician.
Elwood Henneman, 81, American neurophysiologist.
Niall MacDermot, 79, British politician.

23
Hussein Kamel al-Majid, 41, Iraqi general, politician and defector, killed.
Joseph W. Barr, 78, American politician.
David Berlo, 67, American communications theorist.
William Bonin, 49, American serial killer and sex offender known as the Freeway Killer, execution by lethal injection.
Birgit Brüel, 68, Danish actress and singer.
Elisa Cegani, 84, Italian actress.
Alan Dawson, 66, American musician.
Dorothy Awes Haaland, 77, American lawyer and politician.
Saddam Kamel, 35, Iraqi head of the Republican Guard and defector, killed.
Billy Lothridge, 54, American gridiron football player, heart attack.
Helmut Schön, 80, German football player and manager.

24
Akram al-Hawrani, 84, Syrian politician.
Winston Chang, 54, Taiwanese academic and university president.
Graeme Moran, 57, New Zealand rower.
Kaarlo Niilonen, 73, Finnish football player and manager.
James Runcieman Sutherland, 95, English literary scholar.

25
Caio Fernando Abreu, 47, Brazilian writer, AIDS-related complications.
Vehbi Koç, 94, Turkish businessman and philanthropist, heart attack.
Elvy Lissiak, 66, Italian actress.
Haing S. Ngor, 55, Cambodian-American physician and actor (The Killing Fields, Heaven & Earth, My Life), Oscar winner (1985), shot.

26
Jean Boisselier, 83, French archaeologist and art historian.
Anna Larina, 82, Soviet/Russian writer.
Don Oliver, 58, New Zealand weightlifter and fitness centre owner, cancer.
John Dalrymple, 13th Earl of Stair, 89, Scottish Arl.
Mieczysław Weinberg, 76, Polish-Soviet/Russian composer.
Carlos Wilson, 83, Argentinian football player.

27
Gerrit Berkhoff, 94, Dutch chemist and the first Rector Magnificus of the University of Twente.
François Chaumette, 72, French actor, cancer.
Ethlyne Clair, 91, American actress.
Laurie Connell, 50, Australian businessman and fraudster.
Sarah Palfrey Cooke, 83, American tennis player, lung cancer.
Kenneth Granviel, 45, American serial killer, execution by lethal injection.
Vic Janowicz, 66, American gridiron football player, cancer.
Robert Kühner, 92, French mycologist.
Iain Murray, 10th Duke of Atholl, 64, British politician.
Pat Smythe, 67, British equestrian.
Ilario Zannino, 75, American mobster and member of the Patriarca crime family.

28
Daniel Chipenda, 64, Angolan politician.
Maximilien Rubel, 90, Soviet-French Marxist historian.
Bill Smith, 61, American poker player.
Bruno von Freytag-Löringhoff, 83, German philosopher, mathematician and epistemologist.
Sylvia Williams, 60, American museum director, curator, art historian and scholar of African art, brain aneurysm.

29
Frank Daniel, 69, Czech director and scriptwriter, heart attack.
Wes Farrell, 56, American musician, songwriter and record producer, cancer.
Ewart John Arlington Harnum, 85, Canadian businessman and the lieutenant governor of Newfoundland.
Shams Pahlavi, 78, Iranian royal of the Pahlavi dynasty and elder sister of the last Shah of Iran, cancer.
Sinclair Ross, 88, Canadian banker and writer, Parkinson's disease.
Ralph Rowe, 71, American baseball player and manager.
Winifred C. Stanley, 86, American politician and attorney.
Clint Wager, 76, American gridiron football player and basketball player.
Mario Zagari, 82, Italian journalist and politician.

References 

1996-02
 02